The Ouachita River Lock and Dam No. 8 are a historic lock and dam on the Ouachita River in Calhoun County, Arkansas.  The area is managed by the county and the Arkansas Fish and Game Commission as a public recreation area.  The facility offers a boat ramp and a few campsites.

The lock and dam were listed on the National Register of Historic Places in 1983.

See also
National Register of Historic Places listings in Calhoun County, Arkansas

References

External links

United States Army Corps of Engineers dams
Transportation buildings and structures on the National Register of Historic Places in Arkansas
Buildings and structures completed in 1907
Dams completed in 1907
Dams in the Mississippi River basin
Historic American Engineering Record in Arkansas
National Register of Historic Places in Calhoun County, Arkansas
Locks on the National Register of Historic Places
Dams on the National Register of Historic Places in Arkansas
1907 establishments in Arkansas
Ouachita River